= Joseph Hine Rylance =

American clergyman

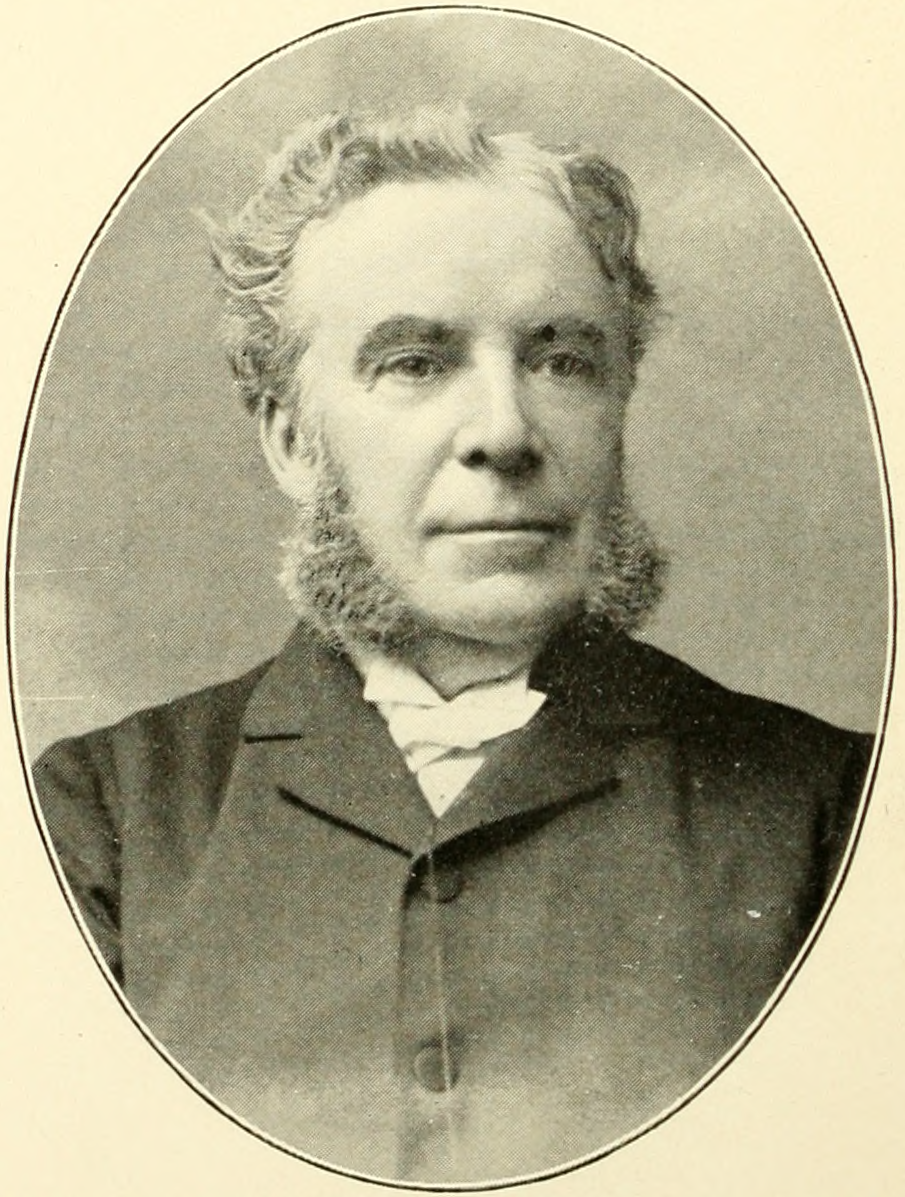
- Born: 1826
- Died: 1907
- Spouse: Ellen M. Coe

Joseph Hine Rylance (16 June 1826 – 1907), clergyman, born near Manchester, England. He was graduated at King's College, London, in 1861, and, after officiating as a curate in London for two years, came to the United States in 1868, and became rector of St. Paul's Church, Cleveland, Ohio. From 1867 to 1871 he was rector of St. James's Church, Chicago, Illinois, and since 1871 was rector of St. Mark's Church, New York City. He received the degree of D. D. from Western Reserve College in 1867. Dr. Rylance belongs to the school of Christian rationalists. He is the author of Preachers and Preaching (London, 1862); Essays on Miracles (New York, 1874); Social Questions : Lectures on Competition, Communism, Co-operation, and Christianity and Socialism (New York, 1880); and Pulpit Talks on Topics of the Time (1881).
